Mohammed Ali Ndume  born (20 November 1959) is a Nigerian politician who was a member of the Federal House of Representatives from 2003 to 2011. He was elected to the Senate for Borno South, Borno State, Nigeria in April 2011 running on the People's Democratic Party (PDP) ticket. He is currently a member of All Progressive Congress (APC).

Early life and education

Senator Mohammed Ali Ndume was born in Gwoza Town of Borno State.
He attended Gadamayo Primary School in Gwoza and completed in 1972. He proceeded to Comprehensive Secondary School Mubi in then Gongola, now Adamawa State from 1973 to 1978 where he obtained his Secondary School Certificate and WASC. He was cut out early in life for Leadership position as he was appointed Junior House Captain and promoted to House Captain in his final year Secondary School.  His exceptional superlative brilliance saw him emerging in constant First position in class at Comprehensive Secondary School Mubi. On completion of Secondary School  he  went on to Kaduna Polytechnic to study Marketing in 1978.  He completed his Ordinary National Diploma (OND) in 1980 and Higher National Diploma (HND) in Marketing in 1982 with Upper Credit level. He proceeded to Federal Polytechnic Ilaro in Ogun State between 1982 – 1983 for his compulsory National Youth Service Corps (NYSC).  He joined the famous Ramat Polytechnic Maiduguri as a lecturer in 1983  rising to the rank of a Senior Lecturer.  In 1988, he was awarded the United States Agency for International Development (USAID) Post-Graduate Scholarship to study Business and Computer Education at the University of Toledo, Ohio, United States of America and graduated with a B.Ed and M.Ed in 1990 and was awarded Magna Cum Laude academic honour.  He was also admitted into the Phi Kappa Phi academic society for outstanding performance. On graduation, he returned to Nigeria and continued with his teaching career with the Ramat Polytechnic Maiduguri, Borno State until 2003, when he fully involved in politics.

ANPP politician

In 2003, Ndume was elected to represent his people of Chibok/Damboa/Gwoza Federal Constituency in the House of Representatives on the platform of All Nigeria People Party (ANPP): a position he occupied from 2003 – 2011.  On the inauguration of the sixth (6th) Assembly in 2007, he was unanimously elected as the Minority Leader  and served creditably.

PDP politician

In December 2010 barely 100 days to 2011 elections Ndume decamped to the PDP, citing the injustices going on in the party as his reason for leaving the ANPP.
He said the people from the grassroots of Southern Borno were solidly behind him.
He said that he was not being given a level playing ground in the competition with other ANPP aspirants for candidature in the Senate election. Apparently he had fallen out with Governor Ali Modu Sheriff.
Ndume's defection to the PDP was seen as a major blow to the ANPP. 
He was said to have been the major financer and the back-bone of ANPP in the Borno-South senatorial zone, and was considered one of the most dynamic of the lawmakers from the northeast zone.

Following Ndume's defection, the PDP re-opened the sale of nomination forms.  Alhaji Sanda Garba, who had been the only aspirant for the South Borno Senate seat, stepped down to make way for Ndume as the PDP candidate.
In the election, Ndume won 146,403 votes, ahead of Dr. Asaba Vilita Bashir of the ANPP with 133,734 votes and Alhaji Unaru Ibrahim of the Congress for Progressive Change (CPC) with 20,414 votes.
Ndume served as the Chairman of the Senate Committee on MDGs in the 7th Senate and remained vibrant and active in the political landscape. Senato. Ndume was removed from his position due to his closeness to the Presidency and support for Economic and Financial Crimes Commission [EFCC] Chairman nominee, Ibrahim magu. The leadership of the 8th Senate led by Bukola Saraki was in conflict with the executive arm throughout the 8th assembly. 
Senator Mohammed Ali Ndume is married to Justice Aisha and Hajia Maryam and blessed with 10 children.

Achievements
Senator Ndume has moved several Motions and sponsored many Bills in the Parliament, the Constituencies Development Fund Bill and Electoral Act Amendment Bill that enabled Internally Displaced Persons (IDPs) voted in 2015 elections.

Political alignments and re-alignments saw him forming CPC with 20 of his colleagues which eventually coalesced into APC, the present ruling party. He was re-elected in the 2015 Senatorial elections and became the Leader of the Senate of the Federal Republic of Nigeria in the 8th Assembly until 2017 when he was replaced with Ahmad Ibrahim Lawan.
Mohammed Ali Ndume was the director campaign to the Rotimi Ameachi

Bills And Motions
Nigerian Peace Corps ( Establishment)Bills
North East Development Commission Bill
Unemployed youths,elderly and indigent sustainability allowance Trust found Bill 
Communication Service Tax Bill
Environmental Health office (Registration etc) Act 2002 (Amendment) Bill
Federal Audit Service Commission Bill
Capital Expenditure Budget Roll Over Bill
NIGERIAN Oil and Gas industry contest development Act 2010 (Amendment) Bill2016
2015 Appropriation Act (Amendment) Bill
Anti-torture Bill
Telecommunications and post offences Act CAP T5 LFN 2004 (Amendment)
National Crop Varieties and livestock breeds (Registration etc)Act CAP N27, LFN 2004 (Amendment) Bill
Produce (Enforcement of Export Standard)Act CAP P32 LFN 2004 (Amendment) Bill
Corruption Practices and other Related offences Act CAP 31 LFN 200
Federal Capital Territory hospital management board (Establishment) Bill
Federal Capital Territory civil service Bill
Prevention of crime Act (Amendment) Bill
Water Resources Act (Amendment) Bill
National Agriculture land development authority Act (Amendment) Bill
Chartered institute of stock brokers Act CAP LFN,2004 (Amendment) Bill
Treaty to Establishment Africa Economic Community Relating to pan African parliament (Accessions & joint solution) CAP T25 LFN 2004 (Amendment) Bill
Utilities Charges Commission Act CAP U17 LFN,2004 (Amendment) Bill
Petroleum Product Pricing Regulatory Agency (Establishment) Act CAP P43 LFN, 2004 (Amendment) Bill
Endangered Species (Control of international Trade and traffic) Act CAP LFN, 2004 (Amendment) Bill
Quantity Surveyors ( Registration) (Amendment) Act CAP Q1 LFN 2004 Bill
Builders (Registration etc) Act (Amendment) CAP B12 LFN2004 Bill
Town planners (Registration) Act Amendment Act CAP T17 LFN 2004 Bill
Small and medium scale enterprises development agency Act ( Amendment) Act CAP C19 LFN 2004 Bill
University of Abuja Act (Amendment) Act CAP U2 LFN (Amendment) Bill
Chartered institute of loan and risk management of Nigeria (Establishment) Bill
Federal Capital Territory transport authority (Establishment) Bill
National child protection and enforcement agency (establishment etc) Bill
Economic and Financial Crimes Commission Act CAP E1 LFN2004 (Amendment) Bill
Dishonoured Cheque (offences) Act CAP D11 LFN 2004 (Amendment) Bill
World meteorological Organisation (protection) Act 2004 (Amendment) Bill
Currency Conversion (Freezing order) Act 2004 (Amendment) Bill
National judicial institute Act 2014 (Amendment) Bill
Advertising practitioner (Registration) 2004 (Amendment) Bill
Need (Import control & management) Act 2004 ( Amendment) Bill
Agriculture and Rural management training Act 2004 (Amendment) Bill
Chartered institute of human capital development of Nigeria (Establishment etc) Bill
petroleum training institute Act 2004 (Amendment) Bill
Advance fee fraud Act 2006 (Amendment) Bill
Value Added Tax Act 2004 ( Amendment) Bill
Veterinary surgeon Act 2004 (Amendment) Bill
National Archives Act 2004 ( Establishment) Bill
Right and obligation under tenancy agreement (Regulation) for the recovery premises in the federal capital territory Bill
Code of Conduct Bureau and tribunal Act 2004 (Amendment) Bill
Animal Health and Husbandry technologies (registration) Bill
Federal capital territory water board (Establishment) Bill
Nigerian in diaspora Commission (establishment etc) Bill
Mortgage institutions Act 2004 (Amendment) Bill
Oaths Act 2004 (Amendment) Bill
Police procurement found (Establishment etc) Bill
Franchise Bill
Dangerous Drugs Act 2004 (Amendment) Bill
Nigerian council for social workers (Establishment etc) Bill
Corporate manslaughter Bill
Chartered institute of projects managers (Establishment) Bill
Nigerian investment promotion Commission (Amendment) Bill
Witness protection Commission Bill
Senior citizens centre Bill
Official secret Act 2004 (Amendment) Bill
National institute for legislative studies (NILSS) (Amendment) Bill
Constituency Development Found Bill
Pension right of judges Act (Amendment) Bill2017
Federal capital territory District courts (Establishment etc) Bill
River Basin Development Authority Act 2004 (Amendment) Bill
Compulsory Treatment and Care of Victims of Gunshot Bill
National film and video censor board Act 2004 (Amendment) Bill
National intelligence Agency Pension Board (Establishment) Bill
Federal College of Dental Technology and Therapy Bill
Federal College of Education Gwoza (Establishment etc) Bill
Federal Polytechnic Matana, Borno, State (Establishment etc) Bill

Constituency projects
Mohammed Ali Ndume has constituency projects spread across all the nine 9 local government areas in his senatorial district (Borno south) As a senator, he is always struggling for the development of his people and the nation's since he assumed office.Mohammed Ali Ndume alone has facilitated more than 60 intervention projects across his senatorial district. These projects includes, construction of classrooms, model primary Health care centers, electrification of rural areas and construction of motorized boreholes were delivered to the residents of selected communities based on their need.Mohammed Ali Ndume also created job opportunities for the youths of his constituency.Mohammad Ali Ndume has drilled twenty 20 boreholes and donated some numbers of tractors in each of the 9 local government area of Borno south.

Awards And Recognition
United States Agency for International Development (USAID) Award
Dreams African Leadership Excellence Award
Diplomatic Award for Iconic Achievement Of Sustainable Development Goals Ambassador Award
Parliamentary Media Award for Leadership

Senate Leadership
Ali Ndume Has been the Senate Majority leader in the Nigerian Senate House after the 2016 elections and impeached by the APC Senators on 10 January 2017.
Senator Ndume on 11 June 2019, loses bid to become Senate President of the 9th Senate. He contested against Senator Ahmed Lawan who emerged Winner.

References

People from Borno State
Living people
Nigerian Muslims
Peoples Democratic Party members of the Senate (Nigeria)
Kaduna Polytechnic alumni
University of Toledo alumni
1959 births